Alderman Sydney Alexander Anderson (born 23 April 1949) is a former Unionist politician from Northern Ireland representing the Democratic Unionist Party (DUP).

Career
In July 2010, he was appointed as David Simpson's replacement in the Northern Ireland Assembly, where he represented Upper Bann.

Regarding the choice, Anderson said "I want first of all to pay tribute to both Robert and Philip who were both very able candidates. It would have been a pleasure to have had either of them at the Assembly and to have worked on their behalf." He is a member of Craigavon Borough Council, and has served as Mayor and Deputy Mayor.

He was a member of the All Party Group on Neurology, Public Accounts Committee and Committee for Justice in the Assembly. He had been a member of the Committee for Social Development, Committee for Employment and Learning and Committee on Standards and Privileges. In 2017 he announced he would not be seeking election for the 2017 assembly election.

References

External links
Profile , bbc.co.uk; accessed 14 May 2016.

1949 births
Living people
Democratic Unionist Party MLAs
Northern Ireland MLAs 2007–2011
Northern Ireland MLAs 2011–2016
Northern Ireland MLAs 2016–2017
People from Portadown
Presbyterians from Northern Ireland
Mayors of Craigavon
Members of Craigavon Borough Council